The 2018 J3 League (referred to as the 2018 Meiji Yasuda J3 League (2018 明治安田生命J3リーグ) for sponsorship reasons) was the 5th season of J3 League under its current name.

Clubs
2017 J3 League 2nd placed Tochigi SC gained promotion to J2 League after another runners-up season; this time, unlike 2016, it was enough to clinch direct promotion. Defending champions are Blaublitz Akita, which became the first club not to gain promotion after winning the championship since J3's inception. Thespakusatsu Gunma was the new entry for the league: it was their first third division season since 2004, when they were promoted to J2 from JFL.

No promotion from Japan Football League came this time. This was another first for the J3 League since its inception.

Personnel and kits

Managerial changes

League table

Results table

Top scorers
.

Attendances

References

J3 League seasons
3